KNOW-FM (91.1 FM) is the flagship radio station of Minnesota Public Radio's news and information network, primarily broadcasting a talk radio format to the Minneapolis-St. Paul market.  The frequency was the original home of KSJN, but the purchase of a commercial station at 99.5 MHz in 1991 allowed MPR to broadcast distinct talk radio and classical music services.

KNOW-FM's studios are located in the MPR Broadcast Center on Cedar Street in downtown St. Paul, while its transmitter is located on the Telefarm Towers in Shoreview.

History
The KNOW intellectual unit dates from 1980, when WLOL (1330 AM) was purchased by MPR in 1980 and changed its call letters to KSJN-AM, a simulcast of its FM sister. MPR was already making plans to offer a two-channel network when it acquired the frequencies to do so, and bought the AM frequency as a stopgap. In 1989, KSJN-AM changed its call letters to KNOW and began airing an expanded lineup of NPR programming. Two years later, MPR bought 99.5 FM–the former WLOL-FM. At that time, MPR moved the KNOW call letters and intellectual unit to 91.1, while the KSJN calls moved to 99.5 as a full-time classical music station. The AM signal was later spun off into a for-profit subsidiary to help fund the public broadcaster, and was eventually sold off. The station has since reverted to its original WLOL call sign.

In the 1970s, KSJN 91.1 FM  and WLOL (99.5 FM) cooperated in an experimental use of quadraphonic stereo, with each station carrying two channels of audio.  However, this "quadcast" had some undesirable "ping-pong" effects, much like early stereo broadcasts using the same method did. As KNOW now mainly broadcasts spoken word programming, the station broadcasts in analog in monaural audio in order to extend the station's coverage to its fullest extent possible.

HD Radio
KNOW-FM features "Radio Heartland", a Web-and HD Radio- service, on its HD Radio subchannel. Its playlist consists primarily of acoustic, singer-songwriter, folk and Americana music. The service launched in December 2008.

Radio Heartland's schedule also includes the programs Live from Here and American Routes from American Public Media, and the shows The Thistle & Shamrock and Mountain Stage from NPR. These additional shows were added to Radio Heartland's schedule in November 2009.

Austin, Texas
The callsign KNOW was also used by a major AC radio station in Austin, Texas, located at 1490 kHz.  The station signed off in 1989 after operating for 50 years.  The Spanish station KLGO assumed the frequency in 1993.

Lufkin, Texas
The callsign KNOW was also used by an oldies station in Lufkin, Texas, located at 1420 kHz, until it suffered a fire and shut down in 1987. It was owned by Pine Air, Inc.

See also
KCMP, MPR's eclectic music station
KSJN, MPR's classical music station

References
Mark Durenberger (1999).  Early quad-casts and other fun.  The Broadcast Archive: War Stories.

External links
Minnesota Public Radio
MPR: KNOW 91.1/KSJN 99.5/KCMP 89.3 Minneapolis/St. Paul

Radio stations in Minneapolis–Saint Paul
Minnesota Public Radio
NPR member stations
Radio stations established in 1967